Cushrow Russi Irani was a prominent Indian journalist and the editor-in-chief of The Statesman. Over an illustrious career, he held a number of posts including Chairman of the Press Trust of India. Irani was widely admired for his criticism and staunch opposition against Indira Gandhi's policy of press censorship during the state of emergency proclaimed in 1975.

In his tribute after Irani's passing away, then Prime Minister of India Manmohan Singh said on 24 July 2005: "Irani was among the tallest of our journalists. He was a distinguished editor, a learned commentator on political, judicial and social issues, an institution builder, a leader in his profession and, above all, a truly secular nationalist."
"He was passionately committed to the welfare of our people and the progress of our Nation. He upheld the finest values in journalism. In his popular column "Caveat" he wrote without fear or favour and earned for himself and his newspaper an enviable place in the Indian media world. As chairman of the Press Trust of India he helped invigorate this organization at a time when it was forced to face the challenge of competition at home and abroad. His expertise in constitutional matters helped the country when he was made member of the Constitution Review Commission."
"I will truly miss Irani and his columns. Indian journalism will miss the quite yet firm leadership of a great editor. I convey my sincere condolences to his family, his friends and his colleagues at the Statesman."

The Statesman, of which he was also the Managing Director, was among very few newspapers to defy censors during the Emergency. Mr. Irani was known as a fierce defender of press freedoms for criticizing government censorship rules in the 1970s during the Emergency. He published blank spaces in The Statesman where reports or photos had been barred.

Cushrow Russi Irani, born in 1931, was the chairman of Press Trust of India (PTI) for two terms, and a member of PTI Board for two decades till his death.

Mr. Irani's contribution to the growth of the press was immense, PTI chairman Philip Mathew said.

A distinguished leader in the media world, Irani was the first Indian to be chairman of the International Press Institute in 1980 and 1981. He was again re-elected in 1990.

Irani was also vice-president of the World Press Freedom Committee, the apex body of press freedom
organisations all over the world and a member of UNESCO's advisory group on press freedom. He was on the board of the International Press Institute (IPI).

A former insurance lawyer, Irani joined The Statesman as its Managing Director in 1968. He took over as the Editor-in-Chief in 1991 where he rested on his laurels as a fearless editor always ready to speak truth to power. In 2003, he relinquished the post of Managing Director but continued to head its board of directors as Chairman.

An uncompromising crusader against corruption, Irani received many national and international awards including the "Knight Commander of the Order of Isabella Catholica" from the then King of Spain for highest loyalty to democracy in 1983.

He was a prolific writer and apart from authoring a number of books on current issues, he used to regularly write his personal column `Caveat` despite a poor health in recent times.

His columns in The Statesman, titled ‘Caveat’, a Journalistic masterclass in Editorials. Sharp, acerbic while dignified, the columns never spared anyone in the government abusing their powers. Under his direction these writings, usually featured in the Statesman's front Page, were compiled into several volumes. Irani was bestowed the prestigious Astor award by the Commonwealth Press Union.

He also received the ‘Freedom Award’ of Freedom House, New York, in 1977.

He was author of well written books: `Pax America-The War That Lost Iraq Its Freedom`, `Ayodhya- Demolishing A Dream` and `Bengal-The Communist Challenge.`

Mr. Irani was also a member of the National Commission to Review the Indian Constitution.

He was educated in Mumbai, where he was born, and in London.

In one of last visits outside India, Mr. C.R. Irani was in Sri Lanka in June, 2005, as the chief guest at the annual Journalism Excellence Awards 2004 organized by the Editors’ Guild of Sri Lanka in association with the Sri Lanka Press Institute at the Mount Lavinia Hotel on 14 June.

The SLPI presented a miniature replica of the trophies awarded to the winners of the Journalism Excellence Awards, to Mr. Irani to take back with him as a memento.

Mr. Irani who died of kidney failure at the Rabindranath Tagore Institute of Cardiac Sciences, is survived by his wife Threety Irani, a leading beautician, and three daughters.

The Statesman Print Journalism School was established in 2008 by the C R Irani Foundation, a not-for-profit body, in memory of Cushrow Russi Irani.

References

Writers from Kolkata
Indian editors
Irani people
1931 births
2005 deaths